Coenraad Jacob Temminck (31 March 1778 – 30 January 1858) was a Dutch aristocrat, zoologist and museum director.

Biography 
Coenraad Jacob Temminck was born on 31 March 1778 in Amsterdam in the Dutch Republic. From his father, Jacob Temminck, who was treasurer of the Dutch East India Company with links to numerous travellers and collectors, he inherited a large collection of bird specimens. His father was a good friend of Francois Levaillant who also guided Coenraad.

Temminck's Manuel d'ornithologie, ou Tableau systématique des oiseaux qui se trouvent en Europe (1815) was the standard work on European birds for many years. He was also the author of Histoire naturelle générale des Pigeons et des Gallinacées (1813–1817), Nouveau Recueil de Planches coloriées d'Oiseaux (1820–1839), and contributed to the mammalian sections of Philipp Franz von Siebold's Fauna japonica (1844–1850).

Temminck was the first director of the National Museum of Natural History in Leiden from 1820 until his death. In 1824, he was elected to the American Philosophical Society. In 1831, he was elected a foreign member of the Royal Swedish Academy of Sciences. In 1836 he became member of the Royal Institute, predecessor of the Royal Netherlands Academy of Arts and Sciences.

Temminck died on 30 January 1858, at the age of 79, in Leiden, Netherlands.

Works 
Temminck, in collaboration with Heinrich Kuhl, is the author of descriptions of parrots, including the rosella Platycercus icterotis.
A tailless mutant of a junglefowl Gallus lafayettii was described in 1807 by Temminck, which in 1868 the English naturalist Charles Darwin incorrectly denied existed. Another junglefowl, described in 1813 by Temminck as Gallus giganteus was, he believed, one of six wild ancestral species of domestic fowl; Darwin, however, demonstrated that the latter has a single (monophyletic) origin.

Species named after Temminck 
A large number of animals were named for Temminck in the 19th century. Among those still in use are:

 Sharks:
 Broadfin shark Lamiopsis temminckii
 Fishes
 Ancistrus temminckii (an armoured suckermouth catfish)
 Dark chub Zacco temminckii (a carp)
 Nipponocypris temminckii (a cyprinid)
 Samoan silverside Hypoatherina temminckii
 The Longnose Pipefish Syngnathus temminckii Kaup, 1856
 Oilfish Rovetus temminckii (synonym)
 Goldribbon soapfish Aulacocephalus temminckii
 Ditrema temminckii (a surfperch)
 Thread-fin fairy-wrasse Cirrhilabrus temminckii
 Kissing gourami Helostoma temminckii
 Reptiles:
Macrochelys temminckii (alligator snapping turtle)
Tytthoscincus temmincki (a skink)
 Birds:
 Temminck's cormorant Phalacrocorax capillatus
 Temminck's tragopan Tragopan temminckii
 Bekisar G. varius × G. gallus "Gallus temminckii"
 Temminck's courser Cursorius temminckii
 Temminck's stint Calidris temminckii
 Malaysian eared nightjar Eurostopodus temminckii
 Purple-winged roller Coracias temminckii
 Temminck's hornbill Penelopides exarhatus
 Ochre-collared piculet Picumnus temminckii
 Sulawesi pygmy woodpecker Dendrocopos temminckii
 Temminck's fruit-dove Ptilinopus porphyreus
 Cerulean cuckooshrike Coracina temminckii
 Australian logrunner Orthonyx temminckii
 Temminck's sunbird Aethopyga temminckii
 Temminck's lark Eremophila bilopha
 Temminck's babbler Pellorneum pyrrhogenys
 Temminck's seedeater Sporophila falcirostris
 Blue whistling thrush subspecies Myophonus caeruleus temminckii
 Javan sunbird subspecies Aethopyga mystacalis temminckii
 Black sparrowhawk subspecies Accipiter melanoleucus temminckii
 Mammals:
 Temminck's mole Mogera wogura
 Temminck's flying fox Pteropus temminckii
 Temminck's tailless fruit bat Megaerops ecaudatus
 Dwarf dog-faced bat Molossops temminckii
 Temminck's trident bat Aselliscus tricuspidatus
 Temminck's mysterious bat Nycticeius aenobarbus
 Temminck's pangolin Smutsia temminckii
 Temminck's golden cat Catopuma temminckii
 Southern right whale Hunterus temminckii (a synonym)
 Temminck's mouse Mus musculoides
 Temminck's striped mouse Hybomys trivirgatus
 Temminck's giant squirrel Epixerus ebii
 Temminck's flying squirrel Petinomys setosus
 Temminck's red colobus Pilocolobus badius temminckii (subspecies)

Bibliography

 Catalogue systématique du cabinet d’ornithologie et de la collection de quadrumanes, avec une courte description des oiseaux non-décrits. Sepps, Amsterdam 1807.
 Histoire naturelle générale des pigeons et des gallinacés. Sepps, Amsterdam 1808–15.
 Manuel d'ornithologie  ou  Tableau systématique des oiseaux qui se trouvent en Europe. Sepps & Dufour, Amsterdam, Paris 1815–40.
 Observations sur la classification méthodique des oiseaux et remarques sur l'analyse d'une nouvelle ornithologie élémentaire. Dufour, Amsterdam, Paris 1817.
 Nouveau recueil de planches coloriées d'oiseaux, pour servir de suite et de complément aux planches enluminées de Buffon. Dufour & d'Ocagne, Paris 1821.
 Atlas des oiseaux d'Europe, pour servir de complément au Manuel d'ornithologie de M. Temminck. Belin, Paris 1826–42.
 Monographies de mammalogie. Dufour & d'Ocagne, Paris, Leiden 1827–41.
 Nouveau recueil de planches coloriées d'oiseaux. Levrault, Paris 1838.
 Iconographie ornithologique ou nouveau recueil général de planches peintes d'oiseaux Paris, 1845–1849.
 Coup-d'oeil général sur les possessions néerlandaises dans l'Inde archipélagique. Arnz, Leiden 1846–49.
 Esquisses zoologiques sur la côte de Guiné ... le partie, les mammifères. Brill, Leiden 1853.
 Las Posesiones holandesas en el Archipiélago de la India. Manila 1855.

Taxon described by him
See :Category:Taxa named by Coenraad Jacob Temminck

References

External links

 Primary works
  Fauna Japonica (1833)
  Iconographie ornithologique ou nouveau recueil général de planches peintes d'oiseaux (1845-1849)
  Esquisses zoologiques sur la côte de Guiné ... le partie, les mammifères (1853)

 Secondary works
  Erwin Stresemann, Analyse von C. J. Temmincks "Catalogue systématique" (1807), Zoologische Mededelingen Vol. 31, 1953, p. 319–331
 A.J.P. Raat, Alexander von Humboldt and Coenraad Jacob Temminck, Zoologische Bijdragen, Vol. 21, 1976, p. 19–38

1778 births
1858 deaths
Directors of museums in the Netherlands
Dutch ornithologists
Dutch zoologists
Members of the Royal Netherlands Academy of Arts and Sciences
Members of the Royal Swedish Academy of Sciences
Scientists from Amsterdam
Taxon authorities